The Association Royale des Radio Amateurs du Maroc (ARRAM) (in English, Royal Association of Radio Amateurs of Morocco) is a national non-profit organization for amateur radio enthusiasts in Morocco.  Key membership benefits of the ARRAM include a QSL bureau for those amateur radio operators in regular communications with other amateur radio operators in foreign countries, and a network to support amateur radio emergency communications.  The ARRAM operates a club station with the call sign CN8MC.  The ARRAM represents the interests of Moroccan amateur radio operators before Moroccan and international regulatory authorities.  The ARRAM is the national member society representing Morocco in the International Amateur Radio Union.

External links 
 ARRAM Historical Overview (in French)
 Official web site (in French)
 http://radioscoutmorocco.e-monsite.com

References 

Morocco
Business organizations based in Morocco
Communications and media organizations based in Africa
Communications in Morocco
Mass media in Morocco
Organizations with year of establishment missing
Radio in Morocco
Organizations based in Rabat